Appalachian gentian may refer to:
 Gentiana austromontana, with blue to purple flowers
 Gentiana decora, with white to blue flowers

Flora of the Appalachian Mountains